Nathaniel Milljour is a self-taught Canadian artist, painter and sculptor from Calgary, Alberta, Canada.

Milljour's Artwork ranges far and wide in subject matter, from traditional architecture, to figures of incredible emotion, depth and color, as well as, more recently, digitally created vector imagery.

Often working under his company name, Studio Noire, his artwork has been featured on promotional materials and album artwork for musicians both Canadian and abroad. He has created promotional work for such varied genres as heavy metal bands Exodus of San Francisco, and Kreator of (Germany), as well as gothic icon and musician Voltaire of New York City, and Canadian Art Rock songstress, Sarah Slean.

His artwork has been featured on subculture gig posters for nightclubs and events across Western Canada, Toronto and in some parts of the US.
He was one of the exhibited artists for the 'DECADEnce, a decade of gothic artwork' show in Vancouver in 2008.

As of 2012, Milljour was one of the main contributors for the official Anne Rice fan club, The Anne Rice's 'Vampire Lestat Fan Club', based out of New Orleans. He is currently the main artist for the visuals of the Annual 'Vampire Lestat Ball'.

Style 
Artwork subject matter ranges from traditional architecture, to figures of emotion, depth and color. Often categorized into Lowbrow, he mainly uses Chiaroscuro, to create vivid Figurative images with somewhat of a Gothic, Erotic, and often Fetish flair.

His artwork was chosen in 2008 by Calgary Transit for their urban renewal program, "Art in Motion" where local artists works were chosen to help decorate unsightly utility boxes in downtown Calgary. His pieces, "Calgary in Green" and "Monoliths, both dark and foreboding surreal cityscapes of Calgary were chosen, and can be seen in both Eau Claire and on Center Street. In the summer of 2010, he was again commissioned by Calgary Transit for mural paintings on 16th Avenue North. Large scale pieces of his artwork can be seen on 16th Avenue and center street as well as decorating the walkway from 16th Avenue to SAIT Polytechnic.

His gig poster artwork is usually a staple in downtown Vancouver, predominantly on the heavily postered Granville Street.

External links
  Studio Noire Homepage of artist Nathaniel Milljour
  Gigposters.com Online gig and music poster collection of Nathaniel Milljour / Studio Noire
Myspace Personal Myspace of Nathaniel Milljour
Studio Noire Youtube Channel
Horror Writer Daniel W. Powell Blog Online review of Murky Depths Magazine
  Image of Milljour's Artwork in Downtown Calgary Calgary "Art in Motion" Urban Renewal Project
DECADENCE A decade of Gothic, Bohemian and Alternative Art
  Red Galleria, Vancouver Special thanks to contributing artists to "Paint Vancouver Red" Auction for Vancouvers Children's Hospital
  Thomas Roche Interview with Nathaniel Milljour for Eros zine New York

References

21st-century Canadian painters
Canadian male painters
Artists from Calgary
Canadian sculptors
Canadian male sculptors
Living people
Year of birth missing (living people)
21st-century Canadian male artists